Peggy Bauer (born Grace Margaret Reid, Chicago, Illinois; March 2, 1932 – March 23, 2004) was an American wildlife photographer whose work appeared in more than twenty-five books with her husband Erwin A. Bauer. They are the most published wildlife photographers in history.

Bauer attended college at Mount Holyoke in Massachusetts.

References

1932 births
2004 deaths
Nature photographers
American women photographers
Place of birth missing
Place of death missing
20th-century American women artists
Mount Holyoke College alumni
21st-century American women